The Rosenlaui Glacier is a 5-km-long glacier (2005) in the Bernese Alps in the canton of Berne in Switzerland. In 1973 it had an area of 6.14 km2.

See also
List of glaciers in Switzerland
Swiss Alps

External links
Swiss glacier monitoring network

Glaciers of the canton of Bern
Oberhasli
Glaciers of the Alps
GRosenlaui